The 1939 Major League Baseball season was contested from April 17 to October 8, 1939. The Cincinnati Reds and New York Yankees were the regular season champions of the National League and American League, respectively. The Yankees then defeated the Reds in the World Series, four games to none. The Yankees became the first team to win the World Series four years in a row.

Awards and honors
Baseball Hall of Fame
George Sisler
Lou Gehrig
Eddie Collins
Willie Keeler
Most Valuable Player
Joe DiMaggio, New York Yankees, OF (AL) 
Bucky Walters, Cincinnati Reds, P (NL)
The Sporting News Player of the Year Award
Joe DiMaggio, New York Yankees, OF
The Sporting News Most Valuable Player Award
Joe DiMaggio, New York Yankees, OF
Bucky Walters, Cincinnati Reds, P
The Sporting News Manager of the Year Award
Leo Durocher, Brooklyn Dodgers

Statistical leaders

Standings

American League

National League

Postseason

Bracket

Managers

American League

National League

Home Field Attendance

Events
January 24 – George Sisler, Eddie Collins and Willie Keeler are elected to the Hall of Fame by the Baseball Writers' Association of America.
April 20 – The Boston Red Sox show off their prize rookie Ted Williams before 30,278 in Opening Day at Yankee Stadium, delayed two days because of rain. After striking out twice, Williams collects a double off pitcher Red Ruffing, who wins 2–0. Yankees first baseman Lou Gehrig makes an error, goes hitless, and lines into two double plays in the only game featuring the two great sluggers. Other notables in what will become a historic box score include Joe DiMaggio, Bill Dickey, Jimmie Foxx, Joe Cronin, Bobby Doerr, Red Rolfe, and losing pitcher Lefty Grove. The Yankees score their first run on a home run by Dickey and their second tally on an error by Foxx. Boston has baserunners in each inning, but Ruffing tosses just the second opening day shutout in Yankees history. Four umpires work the game including third base umpire George Pipgras, the starting pitcher for the Yankees in the 1929 opener; his opponent for the Red Sox that day was Ruffing.
April 21 – Ted Williams plays his first game at Fenway Park, scoring the first run for the Boston Red Sox on a Frankie Hayes passed ball, in a Boston 9–2 victory over the Philadelphia Athletics.
April 23 – In a Philadelphia Athletics 12–8 win over the Boston Red Sox, Ted Williams connects his first major league home run against pitcher Bud Thomas while going 4-for-5.
April 29 – In the seventh game of the season, New York Yankees center fielder Joe DiMaggio makes a sharp turn while fielding a liner facing the Washington Senators and tears muscles in his right foot. The Yankees lose the game and DiMaggio will miss the next 35 games.
April 30 – Lou Gehrig goes hitless in four at-bats against the Washington Senators and is now hitting just .143 this season. He had just played his 2,130th consecutive major league game. No one knew it would be the last of his career.
 May 4 – The mother of Cleveland Indians pitcher Bob Feller watches her son pitch for the first time, against the Chicago White Sox. Chicago player Marv Owen fouled a pitch into the stands which knocked her out. She recovered, but would need stitches to close the wound.
 July 4 – Lou Gehrig day was held at Yankee Stadium. Numerous people, including many from other major league teams, came forward to give Gehrig gifts and to shower praise on the dying slugger. The Yankees retired his uniform number 4; the first player in major league history to be afforded that honor. Babe Ruth even showed up and ended their long-standing feud by giving his old teammate a hug. After the presentations, Gehrig approached the microphone, and addressed the crowd: "Fans, for the past two weeks you have been reading about a bad break I got. Yet today, I consider myself the luckiest man on the face of the earth. I have been to ballparks for seventeen years and I have never received anything but kindness and encouragement from you fans''."
 July 11 – In the first of three times that the All-Star Game has been held at Yankee Stadium, the American League defeats the National League, 3–1, behind pitchers Red Ruffing, Tommy Bridges, and Bob Feller, and a home run by Joe DiMaggio.
July 25 – Yankees pitcher Atley Donald sets a league record for consecutive wins by a rookie, bringing his record to 12–0 with a 5–1 victory over the St. Louis Browns.
July 26 – The New York Yankees tied a major league record by scoring in every inning against the St. Louis Browns. Bill Dickey hit three home runs in the 14–1 win.
August 9 – Red Rolfe of the New York Yankees started a streak of 18 consecutive games in which he scored at least one run. During those games, he scored a total of 30 runs.
August 26 – The first Major League game to be televised occurs, when WXBS-TV broadcasts the game between the Cincinnati Reds and the Brooklyn Dodgers at Ebbets Field.
 October 8 – The New York Yankees win Game Four of the World Series to clinch the four-game sweep against the Cincinnati Reds.
 December 6 – In a trade of veteran shortstops, or "worn-out shortstops", as one newspaper described it, the Chicago Cubs acquire Billy Rogell from the Detroit Tigers for Dick Bartell. Rogell, who injured his arm playing handball the previous year, hits just .136 before hanging up his spikes. The Tigers will release "Rowdy Richard" five games into the 1941 season, but he will stick with the New York Giants until 1946.

Deaths

January 13 – Jacob Ruppert, 71, Yankees owner since 1914
January 19 – Cliff Heathcote, 40, NL outfielder who batted .275 over 15 seasons
January 25 – Abner Dalrymple, 81, star outfielder of the 1880s, leadoff hitter for five Chicago pennant winners
March 8 – Scott Stratton, 69, pitcher, primarily with Louisville, who posted a 34-win season in 1890 which included 15 straight victories
March 28 – Fred Goldsmith, 82, pitcher who steadfastly maintained that he had first thrown the curveball in 1870, six years earlier than Candy Cummings, who gained credit for the development
May 24 – Barney Pelty, 58, pitcher for the St. Louis Browns and one of the first Jewish players in the AL
June 17 – Allen Sothoron, 46, spitball pitcher who spent most of his career with the St. Louis Browns and Cardinals
July 7 – Deacon White, 91, star bare-handed catcher and third baseman for six championship teams in the 1870s and 1880s, and the fourth player to collect 1000 hits
September 25 – Frank LaPorte, 59, infielder who batted .300 three times and led the Federal League in RBIs in 1914
December 3 – Frank Killen, 69, winner of 164 games from 1891–1900, including two 30-win seasons
December 18 – Heywood Broun, 51, sportswriter and editor in New York City since the early 1910s
December 26 – Clyde Engle, 55, utility player who scored the tying run for Boston in the 10th inning of Game 8 of the 1912 World Series, after his earlier pop fly had been dropped

References

External links

1939 Major League Baseball season schedule at Baseball Reference

 
Major League Baseball seasons